Hotel Blanca is a historic hotel building in Nogales, Arizona. It was built in 1917 for Leonardo Gomez, and it served as a storeroom and hotel. It has been listed on the National Register of Historic Places since August 29, 1985.

References

National Register of Historic Places in Santa Cruz County, Arizona
Chicago school (architecture)
Hotel buildings completed in 1917
1917 establishments in Arizona